Richard "Rik" Levins (October 10, 1950 - June 12, 2010) was an American comic book artist and penciller, best known for his work on Marvel Comics' Captain America, where he worked with writer Mark Gruenwald for over three years (1991-1994).

Other titles he contributed to include Marvels' Avengers, AC Comics' Americomics and Femforce, and his own creator-owned series, Dragonfly.

Levins died on June 12, 2010.

Credits 
 H.A.R.D. Corps # 17    Date: APR / 1994  Credits: Penciller
 H.A.R.D. Corps # 18 (with card)    Date: MAY / 1994 Credits: Penciller, Cover Artist
 H.A.R.D. Corps # 19    Date: JUN / 1994 Credits: Penciller, Cover Artist
 H.A.R.D. Corps # 20    Date: AUG / 1994 Credits: Penciller, Cover Artist
 H.A.R.D. Corps # 21    Date: SEP / 1994 Credits: Cover Artist
 H.A.R.D. Corps # 22    Date: OCT / 1994 Credits: Cover Artist
 H.A.R.D. Corps # 23    Date: NOV / 1994 Credits: Cover Artist
 H.A.R.D. Corps # 24    Date: DEC / 1994 Credits: Cover Artist
 Solar, Man of the Atom # 44    Date: MAY / 1995 Credits: Penciller
 Solar, Man of the Atom # 45    Date: JUN / 1995 Credits: Penciller
 X-O Manowar # 1/2    Date: NOV / 1994 Credits: Artist
 X-O Manowar # 1/2 GOLD    Date: NOV / 1994 Credits: Artist
 X-O Manowar # 26    Date: MAR / 1994 Credits: Penciller
 X-O Manowar # 27    Date: APR / 1994 Credits: Penciller, Cover Artist
 X-O Manowar # 28 (with card)    Date: MAY / 1994 Credits: Penciller, Cover Artist
 X-O Manowar # 29    Date: JUN / 1994 Credits: Penciller, Cover Artist
 X-O Manowar # 30    Date: AUG / 1994 Credits: Penciller, Cover Artist
 X-O Manowar # 31    Date: SEP / 1994 Credits: Penciller, Cover Artist
 X-O Manowar # 32    Date: OCT / 1994 Credits: Penciller, Cover Artist
 X-O Manowar # 33    Date: NOV / 1994 Credits: Penciller, Cover Artist
 X-O Manowar # 34    Date: DEC / 1994 Credits: Penciller, Cover Artist
 X-O Manowar # 35    Date: JAN / 1995 Credits: Penciller, Cover Artist
 X-O Manowar # 36 (with SP card)    Date: FEB / 1995 Credits: Penciller, Cover Artist
 X-O Manowar # 37    Date: MAR / 1995 Credits: Penciller
 X-O Manowar # 38    Date: MAR / 1995 Credits: Penciller
 X-O Manowar # 39    Date: MAR / 1995 Credits: Penciller
 X-O Manowar # 40    Date: MAR / 1995 Credits: Penciller

References

External links
List of Levins' credits at the Grand Comics Database

American comics artists
1950 births
2010 deaths